Cheer Up is a 1936 British comedy film directed by Leo Mittler and starring Stanley Lupino, Sally Gray and Roddy Hughes. It was made at Ealing Studios by Lupino's own independent production company. An impoverished team of composer and songwriter try to secure financial backing for their new musical, with the assistance of a struggling actress working as a housemaid.

Cast
 Stanley Lupino as Tom Denham 
 Sally Gray as Sally Gray 
 Roddy Hughes as Dick Dirk 
 Gerald Barry as John Harman 
 Kenneth Kove as Wilfred Harman 
 Wyn Weaver as Mr. Carter 
 Marjorie Chard as Mrs. Carter 
 Ernest Sefton as Tom Page 
 Syd Crossley as Waiter
 Arty Ash as Head Porter 
 Arthur Rigby as Bill Ratchett 
 Doris Rogers as Mrs. Pearce

References

Bibliography
 Low, Rachael. History of the British Film: Filmmaking in 1930s Britain. George Allen & Unwin, 1985 .
 Wood, Linda. British Films, 1927-1939. British Film Institute, 1986.

External links

1936 films
British comedy films
1936 comedy films
Films directed by Leo Mittler
Films set in London
Ealing Studios films
British black-and-white films
Films scored by Percival Mackey
1930s English-language films
1930s British films